The painting titled Madonna of the Cat or Madonna del gatto was painted in 1575 by  Federico Barocci. It is presently in the  National Gallery of London.

History and Description
The painting was made for Count Antonio Brancaleoni of Piobbico. Engravings of the painting appeared by 1577. 

The Holy Family, consisting of Joseph, Mary, a young John the Baptist, and an infant Jesus at Mary's breast, are portrayed in a domestic moment. John appears to be teasing the cat with a captured goldfinch, an allegoric symbol of Christ's Passion. John's reed rests against a wall in the background. The main characters form a proto-Baroque-style diagonal to the right. In the style of Barocci, the cheeks are rosy.

See also
 Study for the Madonna of the Cat

References

1570s paintings
Paintings by Federico Barocci
Collections of the National Gallery, London
Birds in art
Cats in art
Barocci
Paintings depicting John the Baptist